Mario Pasquale Comensoli (15 April 1922 – 2 June 1993) was a Swiss painter. 
He is considered as leading figure of the realist movement, depicting the social evolution of post-World War II Switzerland with key themes ranging from Italian immigrants to the 1968 social unrest, the Disco years and the hopelessness of the 'No Future' youth.

Life
Mario Comensoli was born in Lugano on the 15 April 1922. When his mother died, he was raised by his two sisters in extreme poverty and this sensitized the artist's character and made him aware of the social problems of the poor from the very beginning.

In 1944, the Civic Museum of Fine Arts of Lugano acquired an oil painting after suggestion by Aldo Patocchi. On that same year, thanks to a scholarship, Comensoli went to Zurich where he started attending drawing and history of art lessons at the polytechnic institute.

In Paris, in the early post-war period, he observed Picasso and Léger's work and was quite influenced by their Cubist paintings. In 1948, on his second time in Paris, Miró, the Giacometti brothers and Poliakoff became his new artistic referrals.

Establishing himself in Zurich with his wife Hélène Frei, he grew a passion for popular sports like cycling and football and created the series titled "Cyclists and footballers". In 1953, the Helmhaus Museum of Zurich dedicated him the first important exhibition which represented the past period under the lights of the Lumiere Villas and which received the approval of the critics.

This first creative phase, which was centered on formal construction, soon left space for a new kind of painting that was more aware of reality and human experiences. In 1958 he created the "Workers in Blue" in the Rousseaustrasse studio. He dedicated it to the migrants coming from Italy to whom he felt close. In that same year, Carlo Levi invited him to exhibit his works at the Congress of Immigrants in Rome on whose poster one of the artist's drawings appeared.

He subsequently tackled the themes of the protests of 1968 with a painting manner which was provocative and influenced by Pop Art. He then took on the world of cinema in 1978. In the 80s, starting from alternative punk youths, he started the series "Gioventù in fermento" (Youth in Turmoil). To remember "Discovirus" and "Tell" among the most important thematic moments.

Mario Comensoli died from a heart attack in his studio in Zurich on 2 June 1993. His last big exhibition took place in 1989 at the Kunsthaus of Zurich.

References

External links
 Comensoli Foundation, Zürich
 Private Collection Book
 Mario Comensoli / Work in progress
 Artrust exhibition, Melano

20th-century Swiss painters
Swiss male painters
People from Lugano
1922 births
1993 deaths
Swiss people of Italian descent
Swiss contemporary artists
20th-century Swiss male artists